The Miles M.8 Peregrine was a 1930s British twin-engined light transport monoplane designed by Miles Aircraft Limited.

Design and development
The M.8 Peregrine was the first twin-engined aircraft developed by Miles Aircraft. It was a low-wing monoplane with retractable tailwheel undercarriage. Powered by two 205 hp de Havilland Gipsy Six II engines it had accommodation for two crew and six passengers. The prototype was built at Woodley and first flown there on 12 September 1936. It was entered into the Schlesinger Race between England and Johannesburg but was not ready on time and had been dismantled by late 1937. The aircraft performed well but due to the Woodley factory being pre-occupied with building the Miles Magister military trainer, the aircraft did not enter production. One further example was built with two 290 hp (216 kW) Menasco Buccaneer B6S engines for the Royal Aircraft Establishment.

Operational history
One aircraft was delivered to the Royal Aircraft Establishment, as serial L6346, for boundary layer trials and use as a flying laboratory.

Operators

Royal Aircraft Establishment

Specifications (M.8 Prototype)

References

Notes

Bibliography

 Amos, Peter. and Brown, Don Lambert. Miles Aircraft Since 1925, Volume 1. London: Putnam Aeronautical, 2000. .  
 Brown, Don Lambert. Miles Aircraft Since 1925. London: Putnam & Company Ltd., 1970. . 
 The Illustrated Encyclopedia of Aircraft (Part Work 1982-1985). Orbis Publishing.
 Jackson, A.J. British Civil Aircraft since 1919. London: Putnam, 1974. .
 Jackson, A.J. British Civil Aircraft since 1919, Volume 3. London: Putnam, 1988. .

1930s British airliners
1930s British experimental aircraft
Peregrine
Low-wing aircraft
Aircraft first flown in 1936
Twin piston-engined tractor aircraft